Preston-Gaylord Cobblestone Farmhouse is a historic home located at Sodus in Wayne County, New York.  The cobblestone dwelling was built in 1845–1846, and consists of a -story main block and -story rear wing. Both sections are constructed of irregularly sized and variously colored field cobbles.  Also on the property is a contributing two-story cobblestone carriage house dated to 1845–1846.  The structure is among the approximately 170 surviving cobblestone buildings in Wayne County.  The house is now used as a bed and breakfast known as the Maxwell Creek Inn Bed & Breakfast.

It was listed on the National Register of Historic Places in 2009.

References

External links
Maxwell Creek Inn Bed & Breakfast website

Bed and breakfasts in New York (state)
Houses on the National Register of Historic Places in New York (state)
Cobblestone architecture
Houses completed in 1846
Houses in Wayne County, New York
National Register of Historic Places in Wayne County, New York